The 1982 United States Senate election in Tennessee was held on November 2, 1982, concurrently with other elections to the United States Senate in other states as well as elections to the United States House of Representatives and various state and local elections. Incumbent Democratic U.S. Senator Jim Sasser won re-election. Sasser defeated Republican Robin Beard.

Democratic primary

Candidates
Jim Sasser, incumbent U.S. Senator
Charles Gordon Vick, perennial candidate

Results

Republican

Candidates
Robin Beard, U.S. Representative
William Bryce Thompson, Jr.

Results

Results

See also
 1982 United States Senate elections

References
 

1982
Tennessee
United States Senate